__notoc__
The "Melampodia" is a now fragmentary Greek epic poem that was attributed to Hesiod during antiquity. Its title is derived from the name of the great seer Melampus but must have included myths concerning other heroic seers, for it was at least three books long.

Select editions and translations

Critical editions
 Hesiodi, Eumeli, Cinaethonis, Asii et Carminis Naupactii fragmenta, Guil. Marckscheffel (ed.), Lipsiae, sumtibus Fr. Chr. Guil. Vogelii, 1840, pp. 359-65.
 Hesiodi carmina, Johann Friedrich Dübner (ed.), Parisiis, editore Ambrosio Firmin Didot, 1841, pp. 59-61.
 .
 .
 .

Translations
 .
 Most, G.W., Hesiod: The Shield, Catalogue of Women, Other Fragments, Loeb Classical Library, No. 503, Cambridge, Massachusetts, Harvard University Press, 2007, 2018. . Online version at Harvard University Press.

Notes

Bibliography

 .
 .
 .
 .
 .
 .
 .

Ancient Greek epic poems
Lost poems
Hesiod